"Another Place" is a song by English indie pop band Bastille and Canadian singer and songwriter Alessia Cara. It was released on 25 October 2019 as the fifth single from Bastille's third studio album, Doom Days (2019).

Background
Bastille released the new version of the song with Alessia Cara after she joined the band on stage in her hometown of Toronto during the band's recent US tour. When talking about the collaboration, Dan Smith said, "I'd always heard 'Another Place' as a duet and wanted it to be a story told from two perspectives, it's not something we've ever done, outside of our mixtapes, but we are huge fans of Alessia's — her voice and her song-writing are so distinct and brilliant — and we sent it to her to see if she'd be up for jumping on it with us. We love her verse and everything that she's brought to the song – I think she really elevates it." Cara said, "I met Dan last year and we got on really well, we talked about doing something together and he sent me the song a little while later. I loved the concept and thought it was both sonically and lyrically really great, as all Bastille stuff is. It all came together pretty naturally, and I can't wait for people to hear it."

Music video
A music video to accompany the release of "Another Place" was first released onto YouTube on 1 November 2019.

Track listing

Charts

Release history

References

2019 songs
2019 singles
Alessia Cara songs
Bastille (band) songs
Songs written by Dan Smith (singer)